The Frontier Wrestling Alliance (FWA) Tag Team Championship was a professional wrestling championship contested for in the British Frontier Wrestling Alliance promotion. The title was only contestable by male tag teams and in tag team matches. Being a professional wrestling championship, it was not won legitimately; it was instead won via a scripted ending to a match or awarded to a wrestler because of a storyline. The title was active between March 2000 and December 2006, just before the company folded in March 2007.

The championship has been known as:
FWA Tag Team Championship (March 2000 – October 2002)
FWA British Tag Team Championship (October 2002 – December 2006)

History

After the promotion's national expansion in 1999, there was some interest in tag team matches including large-teamed elimination tag team matches as well as traditional two-on-two contests. At March 2000's Urban Legends a two-round tournament was held to inaugurate the FWA Tag Team Championship with The New Breed (Ashe and Curve) defeating Jorge Castano and Scottie Rock in the finals. The final champions, Stixx & Stone (Stixx and Martin Stone), defended their titles less regularly than previous champions resulting in them being stripped of their titles. Before new champions could be crowned, the FWA lost in an interpromotional rivalry with International Pro Wrestling: United Kingdom (IPW:UK) and had to close as a result. FWA's spiritual successor, XWA, originally promised to revive the Tag Team Championship but presently the belts remain inactive.

As well as being the first champions, The New Breed were also the first team to win the belt twice while member Ashe would later join The Family, a large faction that defended the title under the Freebird Rule which allowed any two members to defend the belts. The Family won the titles more than any other team with three wins, giving Ashe, who also won the championship twice with The New Breed, a total of five reigns individually. The Family, in their rivalry with Alex Shane and Ulf Herman, had a number of matches where the championship was contested under a variety of hardcore rules.

Tournament
The tournament brackets at Urban Legends were:

Title history

See also

Professional wrestling in the United Kingdom
British Open Tag Team Championship
British Heavyweight Championship (XWA)

References

Frontier Wrestling Alliance championships
Tag team wrestling championships